The Great Raid of 2014, also known as the Raid of the 95th Brigade, took place from July 19 to August 10, 2014, during the war in eastern Ukraine. According to official information, units of the Ukrainian 95th Air Assault Brigade, reinforced with assets from the 25th Airborne and 30th and 51st Mechanized Brigades, conducted a 470 km raid, of which 170 km were behind enemy lines. During the raid, the 95th Brigade paratroopers entered into armed clashes with the Russian Army.

Planning
In June 2014, the country's leadership developed a strategic plan that foresaw blocking the Russian-Ukrainian border by the Armed Forces of Ukraine, as well as the surroundings of the cities in the Donetsk and Luhansk regions. In July, the units blocking the border came into the southeast vicinity of Luhansk and in the east of Donetsk regions. ATO command had developed a plan for the release of units at the border. According to the plan, the units of the 95th Air Assault Brigade, 30th Mechanized Brigade, 51st Mechanized Brigade, 25th Airborne were to occupy Savur Mohil, Stepanivka, Marinovka, to establish control over the ferries on the Mius River and to relieve the units of the 24th and 72nd Mechanized and 79th Air Assault Brigades.

The main strike of the operation was the 400 paratroopers of the 95th Air Assault Brigade and tanks of the 30th Mechanized Brigade. All who took part in the operation were volunteers.

Battles

Battle for Lysychansk 
The first battles in the raid began for the liberation of Lysychansk. According to the operation plan, the 95th brigade units were to conduct raids and go to the southern outskirts of the city and from there start liquidating enemy units. The 24th brigade had to do this from the north. Following the 95 brigade, from the south came to the Battalion of the National Guard of Ukraine "Donbas", which carried the operation of liquidation of Russian units in the direction to the city center.

Two days before the assault of Lysychansk, scouts were sent to identify the reference points of militants. The scouts discovered a block post, which wasn't previously known.

On July 19, units 95th brigade went to the offensive. First they destroyed the block post, discovered by scouts on the eve. The advanced detachment set the task to take a strategically important height. From the first time they didn't get it, and was not able to get, and advanced detachment fighters were forced to retreat. However, during a new battle which lasted a few hours the enemy left their positions and the 95th brigade took the height.

After that, the paratroopers took under control the oil refinery, which could be destroyed by Russian troops and separatists. The battle lasted from dinner to the evening of July 19, with 5 paratroopers being killed and 40 injured.That was the greatest joy for all the time of my service. When local saw that armoured personnel carriers with Ukrainian symbols, they ran to salute us. On the way the local people unfolded blue-yellow flags and dressed up vyshyvankas. They were standing along the road clapping, singing the Ukrainian hymn and shouting "Glory to Ukraine!", "Thank you for coming!". — Vasyl Bodnar, soldier of the 95th brigade.

Results
According to official information, the paratroopers carried out a 470-kilometer raid on the rear of the separatists, and at the same time destroyed three hostile checkpoints. However, the most important achievement was the creation of a corridor for units trapped at the border to retreat. Thanks to the skillful actions of paratroopers and infantrymen, 3,000 people and more than 250 pieces of equipment were able to be evacuated safely.

Significance
The raid is noteworthy because of its length and the fact that it was the first time Ukrainian and Russian forces clashed in the War in Donbas. According to Phillip Karber, it was one of the longest armored raids in military history.

The raid was also a significant morale booster for the Ukrainian Armed Forces, especially the Air Assault forces. The skill and conduct of the 95th Air Assault Brigade was praised by American military expert Dr. Phillip Karber.

See also 
 Outline of the Russo-Ukrainian War
Ukrainian Air Assault Forces

References

2014 in Ukraine
Battles in 2014
Battles of the war in Donbas
History of Donetsk Oblast
History of Luhansk Oblast
Battles involving the Donetsk People's Republic
Battles involving the Luhansk People's Republic